Betaabi is a 1997 Indian Bollywood action romance film directed by Rajesh Kumar Singh and produced by Paramjeet Baweja. It stars Arshad Warsi, Chandrachur Singh, Anjala Zaveri and Mayuri Kango in pivotal roles.

Cast
Arshad Warsi as Chetan / Vicky
Chandrachur Singh as Sameer Chandran
Anjala Zaveri as Sheena Ajmera
Mayuri Kango as Reshma
Shakti Kapoor as Ajmera
Gulshan Grover as Brij Gopal
Rakesh Bedi as Peon at Dayal College and Servant at Ajmera's house.
Himani Shivpuri as Dayal College's Principal Radha.
Reema Lagoo as Sameer's mother
Shadaab Khan as Shekhar Bohra
Shama Deshpande as Mrs. Sumitra Ajmera

Music
The music is composed by Vishal Bharadwaj.

References

External links

1990s Hindi-language films
1997 films
Films scored by Vishal Bhardwaj